Chahardangeh Rural District was in the former Hurand District of Ahar County, East Azerbaijan province, Iran. At the National Census of 2006, its population was 8,241 in 1,602 households. There were 7,612 inhabitants in 1,951 households at the following census of 2011. At the most recent census of 2016, the population of the rural district was 7,693 in 2,254 households. The largest of its 42 villages was Arnan, with 687 people. Hurand District was elevated to the status of a county after the census. Chahardangeh became a district and was divided into two rural districts and no cities.

References 

Ahar County

Rural Districts of East Azerbaijan Province

Populated places in East Azerbaijan Province

Populated places in Ahar County